This is an alphabetical list of outlaw motorcycle clubs.

Outlaw motorcycle clubs

See also 
 List of outlaw motorcycle club conflicts
 List of motorcycle clubs
 List of criminal enterprises, gangs and syndicates

References 

Motorcycle clubs

Outlaw motorcycle clubs